The 8.5mm Mars is an experimental centerfire pistol cartridge developed in the late 19th century based on necking down the .45 Mars Long case. The bullet has two deep cannelures, and the case is crimped into both. The case mouth is chamfered on the outside to fit flush into the forward cannelure. This elaborate bullet seating was necessary to withstand the violent feed mechanism of the Mars Automatic Pistol. The cartridge headspaces on the shoulder adjacent to the neck. The case has a thin rim and deep extractor groove in comparison to most rimless pistol cartridges. The Mars cartridges were publicized as the most powerful handgun cartridges through the early 20th century; but fewer than 100 pistols were made and manufacture ceased in 1907.

See also 
 8mm caliber

References

Pistol and rifle cartridges